Iranian handicrafts are handicraft or handmade crafted works originating from Iran.

Basketry and wickerwork 
 , a bamboo wickerwork or textile, used to make floor mats, stools, and fans.
 , a palm leaf basketry.
 , an indigenous boat made of tobacco leaves found in the Hamun Lake region

Carpets and rugs 
 Persian carpet
 Abadeh rug, type of carpet with a large diamond pattern
 Afshar rugs, carpets from the Turkic Afshar tribe
 Ardabil Carpet, the name of two different famous Safavid carpets which became a style
 Dilmaghani, the oldest existing manufacturers of hand knotted carpets
 Gabbeh, a type of Persian nomadic carpet
 Heriz rug, type of carpet with copper in the wool and bold patterns with a large medallion
 Shiraz rug, a type of Persian carpet
 Tabriz rug, genre of carpets found in Tabriz
 Kilims, flat woven rug or tapestry
 , type of Kilim 
 Soumak, flat woven rug, bedding, or tapestry; a stronger and thicker weave than a Kilim

Textiles
Persian embroidery
Pateh, needlework on wool, with colored thread, mostly of silk. It is mostly created by women.
Rasht embroidery
Sermeh embroidery
Zardozi, metal embroidery thread work made of silver or gold.
Balochi needlework
Brocade, shuttle-woven fabrics often made in colored silks and sometimes with gold and silver threads.
Felt, a traditional weaving, common to the Kermanshah province
, a traditional machine woven fabric
Ghalamkar, wood-block printed fabric, often used for table cloths or as bedspreads.
Khameh, silk embroidered on raw-colored fabric, typically in all white.  
Jajim, hand-woven, colorful fabric often found in rural areas
Termeh, hand woven fabric, often used for table cloths, or made into shawls.

Metalwork
Enamelwork (Persian: Minakari)
Metal engraving (Persian: Ghalamzani)
Openwork, a popular style for bronze work
Silver-gilt
Toreutics (Persian: Ghalam-Zani)

Woodwork
Girih, a branch of traditional architecture and tiling strapwork, often made of wood, but sometimes made of other materials.
Moarragh (also known as Moarraq), traditional marquetry or wood inlay
Khatam, marquetry or wood inlay using very small pieces, often made into boxes or to decorate home goods
Wood carving

Pottery and ceramics 

Earthenware
Fritware
Garrus ware
Gombroon ware
Kraak ware
Kubachi ware
Lustreware
Mina'i ware
Moarragh, traditional ceramic mosaic tile developed by the Seljuks

Stone, masonry, and mosaic
, a building material used inside the walls of nomadic black tents called "siah chador".
Hardstone carving
Sculpturing
Stained glass
Firoozeh Koobi, made of a copper vessel that is covered with inlayed turquoise stone.
Stone inlay, the most popular stone used is carnelian, followed by turquoise to make traditional jewelry. The inlay is typically laid in mastic and wax, then fixed with enamel and/or niello.

Painting, drawing, and motifs 
 Persian miniature
 Motifs
 Buta (ornament), a motif style
 , a flower-and-bird motif style
 Paisley (design), a motif style
 Master of Animals
 Lion and Sun
 Illuminated manuscript
 , a gilding and painting technique

See also 
Arts of Iran
Persian art
Persian-Sassanid art patterns

References

External links

 
Iranian culture